Hyattsville is a city in Prince George's County, Maryland, United States, and also a close, urban suburb of Washington, D.C. The population was 21,187 at the 2020 United States Census.

History 
Before Europeans reached the area, the upper Anacostia River was home to Nacotchtank/Anaquashtank people, a Piscataway-speaking Algonquian peoples who lived throughout what is now the Washington, D.C. area. European encroachment and diseases decimated their population and by the 1680s the Nacotchtank/Anaquashtank had largely moved away and merged with other tribes. In the 1720s, John Beall acquired land in the area and established Beall Town, but the town did not prosper like its neighbor Bladensburg. The opening of the Washington–Baltimore Turnpike (modern day ) in 1812 and the B&O Railroad Washington Branch line in 1835 brought more settlers to the area.

The city's founder, Christopher Clark Hyatt (1799–1884), purchased his first parcel of land in the area in 1845. Hyatt opened a store and began mail delivery, officially naming the nascent community "Hyattsville" in his 1859 application to become postmaster. In the years following the Civil War, Hyatt and other local landowners subdivided their properties and sold lots, and the population of Hyattsville grew.  Hyattsville was incorporated as a city on April 7, 1886.

Revitalization projects 
Since 2000, the city has undergone a major redevelopment, including significant residential and retail development in the Arts District Hyattsville (located in the Gateway Arts District), and the area surrounding the Prince George's Plaza Metro station and The Mall at Prince Georges. In the latter area, University Town Center contains residential condos, student housing, office buildings, a public plaza, and retail space, including a 14-screen movie theater and several restaurants, as well as a campus of Prince George's Community College. , additional residential and retail development is underway near the West Hyattsville Metro station. Along Route 1, craft brewers and distillers have played a notable role in revitalizing old commercial properties.

Geography
The City of Hyattsville consists of six subdivisions; Hyattsville Hills, Downtown Hyattsville, Kirkwood, Queens Chapel Manor, Castle Manor, and University Hills. Historic Hyattsville reportedly consists of the Hyattsville Hills, Downtown Hyattsville, and Castle Manor subdivisions.

Climate
Typical of central Maryland, Hyattsville lies within the humid subtropical climate zone (Köppen: Cfa), characterized by hot humid summers and generally cool to mild winters, with high annual precipitation.  Hyattsville lies within USDA plant hardiness zone 7a.

Demographics

Hyattsville has attracted a significant gay and lesbian population. In 2000, same-sex couples accounted for 1.3 percent of households, more than double the national average.

2020 census
The racial makeup of the city was % African American, % White, % Asian, % Native American or Alaskan Native, % Native Hawaiian or Other Pacific Islander, % from other races, and % from two or more races. Hispanic or Latino residents of any race were % of the population.

2010 census
As of the 2010 U.S. census, there were 17,557 people, 6,324 households, and 3,724 families residing in the city. The racial makeup of the city was 33.2% White, 35.6% African American, 0.8% Native American, 4.4% Asian, 0.1% Pacific Islander, 21.4% from other races, and 4.6% from two or more races. Hispanic or Latino of any race were 34.0% of the population (16.4% Salvadorean, 4.1% Mexican, 3.1% Guatemalan, 1.2% Honduran, 1.1% Dominican, 0.8% Puerto Rican).

There were 6,324 households, of which 33.2% had children under the age of 18 living with them, 36.4% were married couples living together, 15.7% had a female householder with no husband present, 6.8% had a male householder with no wife present, and 41.1% were non-families. 31.0% of all households were made up of individuals, and 6.7% had someone living alone who was 65 years of age or older. The average household size was 2.73 and the average family size was 3.39.

The median age in the city was 32.1 years. 22.2% of residents were under the age of 18; 12.6% were between the ages of 18 and 24; 34.7% were from 25 to 44; 23.2% were from 45 to 64; and 7.2% were 65 years of age or older. The gender makeup of the city was 50.8% male and 49.2% female.

2000 census
As of the 2000 U.S. census, there were 14,733 people, 5,540 households, and 3,368 families residing in the city. The ethnic makeup of the city was 41.03% African American, 39.53% White, 18.14% Hispanic or Latino 0.50% Native American, 4.02% Asian, 0.04% Pacific Islander, 10.91% from other races, and 3.98% from two or more races.

There were 5,540 households, out of which 31.9% had children under the age of 18 living with them, 37.3% were married couples living together, 17.3% had a female householder with no husband present, and 39.2% were non-families. 30.6% of all households were made up of individuals, and 7.7% had someone living alone who was 65 years of age or older. The average household size was 2.59 and the average family size was 3.24.

In the city, 24.2% of the population was under the age of 18, 10.3% was from 18 to 24, 34.0% from 25 to 44, 20.5% from 45 to 64, and 10.9% was 65 years of age or older. The median age was 34 years. For every 100 females, there were 91.3 males. For every 100 females age 18 and over, there were 88.7 males.

The median income for a household in the city was $45,355, and the median income for a family was $51,625. Males had a median income of $33,163 versus $31,088 for females. The per capita income for the city was $20,152. About 7.9% of families and 10.8% of the population were below the poverty line, including 14.4% of those under age 18 and 8.4% of those age 65 or over.

Crime
Because the city of Hyattsville shares ZIP codes with surrounding municipalities and unincorporated communities, which are designated as "Hyattsville" by the United States Postal Service, municipal officials have expressed concerns that crime in non-Hyattsville locations is attributed to the city, creating "an image problem" for the city. According to FBI crime statistics, the violent crime rate per 1,000 residents has significantly decreased in Hyattsville, from 11.42 in 2007 to 4.64 in 2019.

Arts and culture

Historic sites
The historic district of the city is home to a number of Victorian houses built in the late 1880s and Sears bungalows and Arts & Crafts houses built between the wars (late 1910s and early 1940s). Historic Hyattsville is roughly bounded by East West Highway to the north; Route 1 to the east; the 38th Street Neighborhood Park to the south, and Queens Chapel Road to the west.

Some historic sites in Hyattsville are listed on the Maryland-National Capital Park and Planning Commission: and the National Register of Historic Places. In 1982, a portion of the city was placed on the National Register of Historic Places as the Hyattsville Historic District; the district was extended in late 2004.

Notable historic sites include Hyattsville Armory and the Hyattsville Main Post Office.

Arts District 
Downtown Hyattsville underwent revitalization in the early 2000s with the development of Arts District Hyattsville, part of the Gateway Arts District, a private  project which includes townhomes, live-work units, and retail space. The master developer of the 25-acre neighborhood was Bethesda-based EYA, and was constructed by EYA, PulteGroup, StreetSense, and Bozzuto Group. A Busboys and Poets restaurant opened in July 2011; other retail offerings include Yes! Organic Market, Elevation Burger, Chipotle Mexican Grill, Spice 6 Modern Indian, and Tara Thai. In the winter of 2015, a traveling exhibition platform Visual Collaborative collaborated with the Arts District Hyattsville Master Association, utilizing the Lustine Center to host a group exhibition themed Vanity.

Pyramid Atlantic Art Center, a nonprofit arts center is located in Hyattsville, in the historic Arcade building.

Public libraries
Prince George's County Memorial Library System (PGCMLS) operates the Hyattsville Branch Library, which in 1964 was the first county-built library building for PGCMLS. PGCMLS dedicated the library to the memory of John F. Kennedy. The original mid-century modern building with its distinctive googie-style flying saucer entryway was demolished in 2019 after a failed effort by preservationists to have the building renovated instead of replaced. The new library building opened on March 30, 2022, with the preserved saucer moved to a reading garden beside the building.

The library system's administrative offices were housed in a building adjacent to the Hyattsville Branch until they were moved to the Largo-Kettering Branch Library in Largo in 2015.

The Hyattsville Branch Library and Northwestern High School are also located in University Hills.

Government 
When first incorporated, Hyattsville was run by a Board of Commissioners; in May 1900, it switched to a mayor and common council system. Today, the city government consists of a popularly elected mayor and a ten-person city council. Each of the five wards in the city are represented by two popularly elected council members.

In January 2015, the Hyattsville Council passed a charter amendment to allow 16- and 17-year-olds to vote in city elections, making Hyattsville one of the few jurisdictions in the United States that has done so. In December 2016, the city expanded voting rights again, granting non-citizen residents the right to vote in municipal elections.

Presidents of the Board of Commissioners 

 Richard P. Evans (1886–87)
 Francis H. Smith (1887–89)
 Francis J. Gramlick (1889–90)
 Jackson H. Ralston (1890–91)
 Frederic A. Holden (1891–92)
 Jackson H. Ralston (1892–93)
 Francis H. Smith (1893–97)
 Michael V. Tierney (1897–98)
 L.K. Miller (1898–99)
 Charles E. Postley (1899–1900)

Mayors 

 Gregory W. Eberwein (1898–00)
 Michael V. Tierney (1900–02)
 Charles A. Wells (1902–06)
 Joseph R. Owens (1906–08)
 John J. Fainter (1908–09)
 William P. Magruder (1909–11)
 Roger Bellis (1911–12)
 Harry W. Shepherd (1912–14)
 Oswald A. Greagor (1914–15)
 Edward Devlin (1915–16)
 John G. Holden (1916–17)
 William A. Brooks (1917–19)
 Matthew F. Halloran (1919–20)
 T. Hammond Welsh (1920–21)
 J. Frank Rushe (1921–25)
 Irvin Owings (1925–27)
 Hillary T. Willis (1927–31)
 Lemuel L. Gray (1931–33)
 Hillary T. Willis (1933–38)
 E. Murray Gover (1938–46)
 R.T. Plitt (1946–47)
 Caesar L. Aiello (1947–51)
 Jesse S. Baggett (1951–54)
 Thomas E. Arnold (1954–55)
 George J. O'Hare (1955–59)
 Joseph F. Lilly (1959–67)
 Charles L. Armentrout (1967–75)
 George C. Harrison (1975–76)
 Jeremiah Harrington (1976–79)
 Thomas L. Bass (1979–95)
 Mary K. Prangley (1995–99)
 Robert W. Armentrout (1999–2003)
 William F. Gardiner (2003–11)
 Marc Tartaro (2011–15)
 Candace B. Hollingsworth (2015–20)
 Kevin Ward (2021–22)
 Robert Croslin (2022– )

County government 
Prince George's County Police Department District 1 Station in Hyattsville serves areas outside of the city that are not located in an incorporated municipality that maintains its own police department.

Federal government 
The United States Postal Service operates Hyattsville Post Office, the West Hyattsville Post Office, and the Prince Georges Plaza Post Office. The Calvert Carrier Annex has a Hyattsville address but is physically in Riverdale Park.

The National Center for Health Statistics, part of the Department of Health and Human Services, is headquartered in Hyattsville and located at University Town Center.

Education

Primary and secondary schools
Hyattsville Elementary, Felegy Elementary, Hyattsville Middle, and Northwestern High School, along with the Chelsea School, St. Matthews, DeMatha, and St. Jerome Academy are located within the city limits.

Public schools

The city is served by Prince George's County Public Schools, and its borders overlap with the enrollment areas for the following public schools:
 Hyattsville Elementary School
 Edward M. Felegy Elementary School
 Rosa Parks Elementary School
 University Park Elementary School
 Rogers Heights Elementary School
 Hyattsville Middle School
 Nicholas Orem Middle School
 William Wirt Middle School
 Northwestern High School
 Bladensburg High School

During the era of legally-required racial segregation of schools, black students from Hyattsville attended Lakeland High School in College Park in the period 1928–1950; Fairmont Heights High School, then near Fairmount Heights, replaced Lakeland High and served black students only from 1950 to 1964; around 1964 legally-required racial segregation of schools ended.

Private schools
 Chelsea School (5–12) for students with language-based learning disabilities and ADD/ADHD
 DeMatha Catholic High School (9–12)
 St. Francis International School (Catholic) (K–8) (St. Mark the Evangelist Campus) —  it is primarily used for summer programs and athletics, with classes held in the Silver Spring campus.
 Formerly St. Mark the Evangelist School, closed and merged into Saint Francis International, which opened in 2010. Beginning in 2013 College Park Academy (CPA) leased the St. Francis building; in 2017 CPA moved to its permanent Riverdale Park campus.
 St. Jerome Academy (Catholic) (Pre-K–8)
 St. Matthew's Parish Day School (Episcopal) (Pre-K–K)

Colleges and universities
Prince George's Community College has an extension center in University Town Center. The University of Maryland campus in College Park is located approximately 2 miles north on Baltimore Avenue (Route 1) from historic Hyattsville.

Infrastructure

Transportation

Roads and highways

Several major surface highways serve Hyattsville. The most prominent of these is U.S. Route 1, which follows Rhode Island Avenue and Baltimore Avenue through the center of the city. US 1 connects southward to Washington, D.C. and northward through College Park to Interstate 95/Interstate 495 (the Capital Beltway). U.S. Route 1 Alternate follows the southern section of Baltimore Avenue to Bladensburg and provides an alternate route to Washington, D.C. Maryland Route 410 follows East-West Highway, connecting many of Washington, D.C.'s inner suburbs with Hyattsville. Two other state highways serving to connect Hyattsville to nearby towns include Maryland Route 208 and Maryland Route 500.

Public transportation
The Hyattsville Crossing and West Hyattsville Metro station both serve Hyattsville. Hyattsville is also served by the Riverdale MARC commuter train station, as well as a few Metrobus and TheBus routes. Students and staff at the University of Maryland have access to the free Shuttle–UM bus that goes from historic Hyattsville to the University of Maryland campus in College Park.

Bikeways
Hyattsville is well connected to regional Anacostia Tributary Trail System network of hiker–biker trails, including the Northwest Branch Trail, which runs along the southern and western sides of the city, and the Rhode Island Avenue Trolley Trail. Numerous city streets include bicycle sharrows, along with a few unprotected bike lanes. Capital Bikeshare has eight bikeshare stations within the city.

Electric vehicles
In 2017, the Hyattsville City Police Department became the first law enforcement agency in the United States to put a Chevrolet Bolt (all-electric) fully marked police patrol vehicle into service.  It has since added an all-electric police motorcycle, and six public electric vehicle charging stations, which are free to use by the public.

Notable people
Joanne C. Benson, Maryland State Senator (District 24)
Bill Butler, former Major League Baseball pitcher
David Driskell, artist, scholar, and curator
Markelle Fultz, NBA player, DeMatha graduate; first-overall selection of the 2017 NBA Draft 
Parris Glendening, Maryland governor (1995-2003), began his political career as a member of Hyattsville City Council
Arthur Frederick Goode III, murderer who killed two children in the mid 1970s
Anne Healey, Maryland House of Delegates (District 22)
Boris Kowerda, Russian White émigré assassin, monarchist and editor
Robert B. Luckey, Marine Corps lieutenant general
John C. Mather, Nobel laureate in physics
Jamie McGonnigal, voice actor and activist
Paul Rabil, Major League Lacrosse player
Dorothy Hope Smith, illustrator of the famous Gerber Baby
Kameron Taylor (born 1994), basketball player for Maccabi Tel Aviv in the Israeli Basketball Premier League and the EuroLeague
Frances Tiafoe (born 1998), professional tennis player
Chase Young, American football player, graduate of DeMatha

In popular culture
The city was involved in a minor controversy in April 2006. In the episode airing April 27, the Geena Davis television series Commander in Chief depicted Hyattsville as having twelve murders in six months; it also indirectly depicted the city as being an urban ghetto dominated by poor minorities. The city and Prince George's County were very upset at ABC. On May 1, ABC formally apologized to both the city and county.

Washington, D.C., based detective novelist George Pelecanos has included Hyattsville in some of his novels, including The Man Who Came Uptown.

Explanatory notes

References

External links

 

 
1845 establishments in Maryland
Cities in Maryland
Cities in Prince George's County, Maryland
Populated places established in 1845
Washington metropolitan area